Radio JXL: A Broadcast from the Computer Hell Cabin is the third studio album by Dutch electronic music producer Junkie XL. Released in 2003, the double album features collaborations with a number of other artists. The songs on the first disc ("3PM") are generally short and vocally-driven much like modern pop, though many of them are more upbeat, with JXL relying on the more heavier electronic genres, including big beat and house. The second disc ("3AM") consists mostly of progressive house songs. Disc one is available in Australia as a single disc version with the same name as the double-disc version. On the CD, it has "3PM". The cover artwork is the same as the double disc version. This single disc version of "3PM" is the British/European version, containing a total of 19 tracks, instead of the US release of 17 tracks. Two additional albums were released from the website radiojxl.com, which has since been repurposed. These albums were entitled 7AM Ambient and 7AM Dance.

Track listing

CD version – "3AM" and "3PM"

Disc one
 "Intro 3PM"
 "Tennis"
 "Crusher" 
 "Don't Wake Up Policeman" 
 "Reload" 
 "Spirits" 
 "Angels" 
 "Perfect Blue Sky" 
 "Between These Walls" 
 "Access to the Excess" 
 "Catch Up to My Step" 
 "Never Alone" 
 "Configuring Audio System"
 "A Little Less Conversation" 
 "Beauty Never Fades" 
 "Broken" 
 "JXL Radio Technical Support"

Disc two
 "Intro 3AM"
 "Chilled"
 "Dubzilla"
 "Casio"
 "Angels" 
 "Breezer" 
 "Nudge"
 "Red"
 "Beauty Never Fades" 
 "Cosmic Cure"
 "Reshurc"

Note: These track lists refer to the US version. For the British or European version, see Discogs.

Downloadable "7AM" albums

7AM – Ambient
 "Reload (7AM remix)" 
 "Talk Tonight"
 "Streets"
 "Twilight"
 "Rivers" 
 "Tommy Dub" 
 "Sphere" 
 "All I Want" 
 "Mogwai"

7AM – Dance
 "Tennis"
 "Electro"
 "Angels (7AM Surreal mix)" 
 "Techno Ibiza"
 "Drubba Drub"
 "Destiny"
 "Egypt"
 "Heat"
 "Groovy"
 "See the Light"

Singles
"Beauty Never Fades" 
"Breezer" 
"Catch Up to My Step" 
"Don't Wake Up Policeman" 
"Between These Walls"

References

Junkie XL albums
2003 albums
Universal Records albums
Roadrunner Records albums